KJTH (89.7 FM) is a non-commercial, educational radio station licensed to serve the community of Ponca City, Oklahoma. It currently airs a Christian contemporary format.

History
KZTH was on April 11, 2018. KTHF was on July 30, 2010. KXTH was on October 23, 2003. KTHL was on December 11, 2010. KIXO was on October 5, 2018. KTHM was on October 23, 2018. K261DR was on August 9, 2010. K289AU was in May 2005. K290DP was on November 9, 2009. K233CR was on April 15, 2014. K232ET was on September 24, 2014. K269GL was on September 7, 2016.

Repeaters and translators
The House FM is also heard in the Oklahoma City metropolitan area on 88.5 KZTH, in the Elk City, Oklahoma area on 89.9 KTHF, in the Seminole, Oklahoma area on 89.1 KXTH, the Altus, Oklahoma area on 89.3 KTHL, Sulphur, Oklahoma area on 106.1 KIXO, and Waynoka, Oklahoma area on 94.1 KTHM, as well as eight low powered translators. As part of an effort to increase signal in and around Oklahoma City, KTST-HD2 switched their signal from sister station KLVV in 2021.

References

External links

Contemporary Christian radio stations in the United States
Radio stations established in 1975
JTH